Broscosoma is a genus of beetles in the family Carabidae, first described by Wilhelm Gottlob Rosenhauer in 1846.

Species 
Broscosoma contains the following species:
 Broscosoma annemariae Deuve, 2004
 Broscosoma baldense Rosenhauer, 1846
 Broscosoma benesi Dvorak, 2006
 Broscosoma bicoloratum Kavanaugh & Liang, 2021
 Broscosoma businskae Dvorak, 1998
 Broscosoma convexum Deuve, 1983
 Broscosoma danbaense Deuve, 2014
 Broscosoma danzhuense Kavanaugh & Liang, 2021
 Broscosoma deuvei Lassalle, 1982
 Broscosoma doenitzi (Harold, 1881)
 Broscosoma dostali Deuve, 2006
 Broscosoma dostalianum Deuve, 2014
 Broscosoma farkaci Sciaky & Facchini, 2005
 Broscosoma furvum Kavanaugh & Liang, 2021
 Broscosoma gaoligongense Deuve & Wrase, 2015
 Broscosoma gongshanense Kavanaugh & Liang, 2021
 Broscosoma gracile Andrewes, 1927
 Broscosoma guoliangi Jiang, Liu & Wang, 2021
 Broscosoma guttiliforme Deuve, 1985
 Broscosoma herculeanum Deuve, 2011
 Broscosoma holomarginatum Kavanaugh & Liang, 2021
 Broscosoma janatai Deuve, 2008
 Broscosoma jintangense Deuve, 2008
 Broscosoma kalabi Deuve, 1993
 Broscosoma kalabianum Deuve, 2014
 Broscosoma lumbasumba Deuve, 2011
 Broscosoma monticola Habu, 1973
 Broscosoma montreuili Deuve, 2006
 Broscosoma moriturum Semenov, 1900
 Broscosoma mourzinei Deuve, 2011
 Broscosoma parvum Kavanaugh & Liang, 2021
 Broscosoma purpureum Kavanaugh & Liang, 2021
 Broscosoma qiului Jiang, Liu & Wang, 2021
 Broscosoma relictum Weissmandl, 1936
 Broscosoma resbecqi Kavanaugh & Liang, 2021
 Broscosoma ribbei Putzeys, 1877
 Broscosoma rolex Morvan, 1995
 Broscosoma schawalleri Deuve, 1990
 Broscosoma sehnali Deuve, 2006
 Broscosoma semenovi Belousov & Kataev, 1990
 Broscosoma sichuanum Deuve, 1990
 Broscosoma stefani Sciaky & Facchini, 2005
 Broscosoma surkiense Deuve, 2004
 Broscosoma tawangense Deuve, 2006
 Broscosoma tiani Deuve, 2006
 Broscosoma tibetanum Facchini, 2002
 Broscosoma uenoi Habu, 1973
 Broscosoma valainisi Barsevskis, 2010
 Broscosoma viridicollare Kavanaugh & Liang, 2021
 Broscosoma xuechengense Deuve, 2008
 Broscosoma xuhaoi Jiang, Feng & Wang, 2020
 Broscosoma zhengyuandongi Jiang, Feng & Wang, 2020

References

Broscinae
Carabidae genera